In Chinese culture, hometown or ancestral home is the place of origin of one's extended family. It may or may not be the place where one is born. For instance, two people may both be born in Shanghai, but the hometowns of their ancestors may be different.

Definition 
A subjective concept, a person's ancestral home could be the birthplace of any of their patriline ancestors. Su Shi limited it to five generations, i.e. it refers to the home of one's great-great-grandfather. Even more broadly, an ancestral home can refer to the first locality where a surname came to be established or prominent. Commonly, a person usually defines their hometown as what their father considers to be his ancestral home. In practice, most people would define their ancestral homes as the birthplace of their patriline ancestors from the early 20th century, around the time when government authorities began to collect such information from individuals.

Moreover, a person's ancestral home can be defined in any level of locality, from province and county down to town and village, depending on how much an individual knows about their ancestry.

Implications 
The Chinese emphasis on a person's ancestral home is a legacy of its history as an agrarian society, where a family would often be tied to its land for generations. In Chinese culture, the importance of family and regional identity are such that a person's ancestral home or birthplace plays an important social role in personal identity. For instance, at a university, students who hail from the same region will often become members of the regional/hometown society or club for other people with the same background. Discussion of personal or ancestral origins is typical when two people meet for the first time. In recent years, the root-seeking (尋根 xúngēn) movement has led to greater interest in ancestral hometowns, especially among overseas Chinese.

Ancestral lineages are an important part of Chinese business culture as it plays a central part of negotiating guanxi. It can also have implications in other areas like politics. See: Shanghainese people in Hong Kong for an example of how ancestry and lineage systems play a part in business practices.

Ancestral home is an item to be filled in many documents in the People's Republic of China Forms that required listing of "ancestral home" (籍貫) included school handbooks to be signed by the parents of schoolchildren.

Taiwan 
National ID cards issued in Taiwan by the Republic of China government formerly carried an entry for "home citizenship" (本籍). Citizens would usually have their ancestral home (defined through the patriline) stated on these documents, despite having never set foot in their ancestral home. This practice was abolished by the government in the mid-1990s amid the Taiwan localization movement.

See also 

 Ancestral shrine and ancestor tablets
Bon-gwan
 Chinese ancestral worship
Chinese kin
Family register
Hukou system
Place of origin
Registered domicile

Footnotes

External links 
籍貫 (zik6 gun3 | ji2 guan4) : ancestral land; native place - CantoDict

Chinese culture